KGFT (100.7 FM) is a Christian talk radio station in Colorado Springs, Colorado.  The station is owned by the Salem Media Group.

History
The station signed on in 1977 as KZLO aka "Z100" and served the Pueblo market.  The station evolved into a CHR format and changed its call letters to KATM and eventually its on-air moniker to "The Kat."  It made its move into the Colorado Springs market in 1988, and due to competition from then top rated CHR KIKX, as well as KKMG who also moved into the Colorado Springs market, KATM adjusted its playlist and became the market's local "Rock 40" station.  By 1991 KATM evolved into an album rock station, but in 1992 KATM was sold to Salem Communications and became KGFT.  The KATM calls were later picked up by a country music station in the Modesto/Stockton market.  The KZLO calls were picked up by Educational Media Foundation for their K-Love station in Kilgore, Texas.

Previous Logo

External links
100.7 KGFT - Official Site

GFT
GFT
Radio stations established in 1977
GFT
1977 establishments in Colorado
Salem Media Group properties